The R486 road is a regional road in Ireland which links Ballyline and Killimer in County Clare. The road passes through the village of Knock.

See also 

 Roads in Ireland
 National primary road
 National secondary road

References 

Regional roads in the Republic of Ireland

Roads in County Clare